Robin Riggs is a British-born comic book artist. The majority of his published work has involved working as an inker for Marvel Comics and DC Comics.

Career
Riggs' first professional comics work was as a result of winning the "Marvel Try-out Book" in the 1980s for lettering; prior to that, he had already been working as a graphic artist for several years.

Early work consisted of inking a lot of the Marvel UK titles during their expansion into the American market, including both Genetix series

His 2008 projects include providing the art for a five-issue "Sir Apropos of Nothing" story written by Peter David and published by IDW Publishing.

Personal life
Riggs is married to Elayne Riggs, who has appeared with her husband at conventions.

Bibliography
Captain Planet and the Planeteers #6 (inks, with author Pat Kelleher and pencils by Dave Taylor, Marvel Comics, 1992)
Genetix (Marvel UK):
 Codename: Genetix (1993)
 Genetix (1993–1994)
Death's Head II #5, 14 (Marvel UK, 1993, 1994)
Super Soldiers #8 (Marvel UK, 1993)
Cyberspace 3000 #6 (Marvel UK, 1993)
Death Wreck #1 (Marvel UK, 1994)
X-Men Unlimited #5-7 (Marvel Comics, 1994)
The Incredible Hulk #425-432, 436–446 (Marvel Comics, 1995–1996)
Supergirl: Louder Than Words #65 (with Leonard Kirk DC Comics, 2002)
Suicide Squad: Raise the Flag (DC Comics, 2007–2008)
Tangent: Superman's Reign #2-5 (DC Comics, 2008)

Notes

References

External links

Robin Riggs' online portfolio
Robin Riggs' autobiography

People from Bexhill-on-Sea
Living people
1961 births
British comics artists